An Jaehyeon may refer to:

Ahn Jae-hyun (born 1987), South Korean actor
An Jae-hyun (born 1999), South Korean table tennis player

See also
Ahn Jae-hyung (born 1965), South Korean table tennis player and coach